Ramraiyas (Gurmukhi: ਰਾਮਰਾਈਆ; rāmarā'ī'ā), also referred to as Ram Raiyas, are a Sikh sect that follow Baba Ram Rai, the excommunicated eldest son of Guru Har Rai (1630–61).

Ram Rai was sent by his father as an emissary to the Mughal emperor Aurangzeb in Delhi. Aurangzeb objected to a verse in the Sikh scripture (Asa ki Var) that stated, "the clay from a Musalman's grave is kneaded into potter's lump", considering it an insult to Islam. Baba Ram Rai explained that the text was miscopied and modified it, substituting "Musalman" with "Beiman" (faithless, evil) which Aurangzeb approved. The willingness to change a word led Guru Har Rai to bar his son from his presence, and name his younger son as his successor. Aurangzeb responded by granting Baba Ram Rai a jagir (land grant) in Garhwal region (Uttarakhand). The town later came to be known as Dehradun, after Dehra referring to Baba Ram Rai's shrine.

Many followers of Ram Rai settled with Ram Rai, they followed Guru Nanak, but Sikhs have shunned them. They were one of the Panj Mel, the five reprobate groups that Sikhs are expected to shun with contempt. The other four are the Minas, the Masands, the Dhirmalias, the Sir-gums (those Sikhs who accept Amrit baptism but subsequently cut their hair).

See also
Namdharis
Ramgharia
Guru Ram Rai Darbar Sahib

References

Sikh groups and sects